Georgiou I Square is the central square of Patras, Greece. The square is named after King George I of Greece. It is crossed by Maizonos, Korinthou and Gerokostopoulou streets. The neoclassical Apollon Theatre is situated on the northeast side of the square.

History
Georgiou I Square was built under the Kapodistrias government as a part of the 1829 plans by Stamatis Voulgaris to rebuild the devastated centre of Patras after the Greek War of Independence. Unlike the old city, the new city was built according to a grid plan with several large squares. 

The square has been renamed several times: Dimokratias at first, then Kalamogdarti, Othonos, Kentriki, Thomopoulou, Ethniki, Palligenesias and since 1863 Georgiou I. In the square there are two fountains, constructed in Denmark.

Gallery

References

The first version of the article is translated and is based from the article at the Greek Wikipedia (el:Main Page)

Streets and squares in Patras
Tourist attractions in Patras
Neoclassical architecture in Greece